Jan Vodička (13 April 1932 – 28 September 2014) was a Czech ice hockey goaltender who competed in the 1956 Winter Olympics. He was born in České Budějovice, Czechoslovakia and died after a short illness in September 2014.

The first man with trapper in Czechoslovakia.

References

1932 births
2014 deaths
Czech ice hockey goaltenders
Ice hockey players at the 1956 Winter Olympics
Olympic ice hockey players of Czechoslovakia
Sportspeople from České Budějovice
Czechoslovak ice hockey goaltenders